Fisher Aubrey Tull, Jr. (September 23, 1934 – August 23, 1994), known professionally as Fisher A. Tull, aka Mickey Tull, was an American composer, arranger, educator, administrator, and trumpeter.

Life and career
Tull was born in Waco, Texas, where he attended public schools.  He eventually earned three degrees from the University of North Texas:  a B.M. in music education (1956), a M.M. in music theory (1957), and a Ph.D. in music composition (1965).  He studied trumpet with John Haynie and composition with Samuel Adler.  While an undergraduate, he played trumpet in and arranged for various jazz and dance bands, including the University of North Texas Lab Bands.

In 1957 Tull became a faculty member at Sam Houston State University in Huntsville, Texas, serving as Chairman of the Department of Music since 1965.

Tull entered into serious composition beginning in the early 1960s.  His works are generally tonal but harmonically adventurous and rhythmically vigorous, and show a strong influence of Medieval and Renaissance music.  His catalog of compositions include over 80 published works for orchestra, band, chorus, and chamber ensemble, although he is known particularly for his works for concert band, brass, and percussion ensemble. Most of his works are published by Boosey & Hawkes (with which he was on contract since 1974) and Southern Music Company, with other works available from Western International Music, Ludwig Publishing Company, TRN, and the International Trombone Association Manuscript Press.

Tull died in Huntsville, Texas.  On July 13, 1996 the Fisher A. Tull Memorial Gazebo was dedicated in downtown Huntsville.

Selected works
Prelude and Double Fugue
Studies in Motion
Cryptic Essay
The Final Covenant
Jargon After William Billings
Liturgical Symphony
 Swing Board
 March for Tripod
Sketches on a Tudor Psalm
Sonata for Trumpet and Piano
Three Bagatelles
Segments
Concerto Grosso
The Binding
Sonatine for percussion ensemble (1971)
Rhapsody for Trumpet and Winds (1980)
Jargon (After William Billings) (1976)

References

Byrd, Richard William (1992). "A Stylistic Analysis of the Solo and Chamber Music of Fisher A. Tull." Ph.D. dissertation. Lexington, Kentucky: University of Kentucky.

Discography
Sam Houston State University Symphonic Band and Wind Ensemble, Ralph L. Mills, Conductor (1981).  The Compositions of Fisher A. Tull, v. 2.  LP.  Golden Crest Records.

External links
Official Fisher Tull website
Fisher Tull biography 
Fisher Tull list of compositions
Fisher Tull discography
Fisher Aubrey Tull, Jr., "An Analysis of the Works for Solo Trumpet by Alan Hovhaness" (Masters Thesis, 1957) University of North Texas Digital Library

20th-century classical composers
American male classical composers
American classical composers
1934 births
1994 deaths
People from Waco, Texas
Pupils of Samuel Adler (composer)
Sam Houston State University faculty
University of North Texas College of Music alumni
Distinguished Service to Music Medal recipients
American classical trumpeters
American male trumpeters
20th-century trumpeters
20th-century American composers
Classical musicians from Texas
20th-century American male musicians